Tor Maries, who performs as Billy Nomates, is a solo English songwriter & musician who now lives in Bristol, England.

Life
Maries grew up in Leicester and was a member of a number of bands that failed to be noticed. Following a period of depression, a Sleaford Mods gig inspired Maries to return to making music and she moved to Bournemouth to write and compose. Her stage name, Billy Nomates, was taken from an insult directed at her when she turned up at the gig on her own.

Music
Maries' first album was recorded in Bristol with Portishead’s Geoff Barrow. She released this in 2020 and quickly gained attention from BBC Radio 6 Music. She describes her music as No-wave. Critics make mention of post-punk and describe her delivery as sprechgesang. She featured on "Mork n Mindy" by Sleaford Mods in 2021. She released the Emergency Telephone EP in October 2021, produced by herself on the Geoff Barrow label.

Reception
BBC Radio 6 Music DJ Amy Lamé chose Billy Nomates's debut as her Album of the Year in 2020. The Guardians Laura Snapes picked out Billy Nomates as one to watch in 2020, describing her voice as "deadpan yet biting", offering "an acute lens on British class structure".

Discography

Studio albums
 Billy Nomates (2020)
 CACTI (2023)

EPs
 Emergency Telephone (2021)

Music videos

References

Post-punk musicians
Musicians from Leicestershire
Living people

Year of birth missing (living people)